Will o' the Wisp  (Dr. Jackson Arvad) is a fictional character, a supervillain appearing in American comic books published by Marvel Comics. He is a physicist who gained control over the electromagnetic attraction between his body's molecules, allowing him to adjust his density (like the Vision). He is most often a foe of Spider-Man.

The character first appeared in The Amazing Spider-Man #167 (Apr 1977).

Fictional character biography
Jackson Arvad was born in Scranton, Pennsylvania.  A former employee at Roxxon Oil, he worked in the division dedicated to electromagnetic research as a scientist. Under constant pressure of being fired, Arvad spent much time furthering his work on electromagnetism, getting little sleep in the process. He eventually ended up falling asleep on the job, unable to save himself from a laboratory accident that would change his life.

He ended up being caught in the electromagnetic field of a device he was working on, the device weakening the electromagnetic attraction between the molecules in his body, threatening his life. When his boss learned of the accident, he decided to let Arvad die, but not before he demanded any scientific applications the device would have had.

However, Arvad was able to save himself when he learned he was suddenly able to control the level of attraction between his body's molecules.

Will o' the Wisp was forced by his employer, Jonas Harrow, to carry out criminal activities. Spider-Man persuaded him instead to resist Harrow.

He attempted to kill his employer, Jonas Harrow multiple times but was stopped each time by either Spider-Man or inadvertently by Tarantula.  Finally, he opted to simply hypnotize the man into confessing his crimes to the police.

Will o' the Wisp later took control of Killer Shrike's battle-suit and kidnapped Dr. Marla Madison, who restored him to his corporeal form. Will o' the Wisp later forced his former partner, James Melvin, to expose the Brand Corporation's illicit activities to the news media.

Will o' the Wisp later first encountered The Outlaws while hunting down Spider-Man in connection with a crime. Will o' the Wisp eventually joined the Outlaws as an adventurer, to rescue the kidnapped daughter of a Canadian official.

Civil War
Years later, Will o' the Wisp would show up in league with the Scarecrow and later the Molten Man as part of the Chameleon's plot to get revenge on Peter Parker after unmasking during Civil War.

He was seen among an army of supervillains organized by Hammerhead that was captured by Iron Man and S.H.I.E.L.D. agents.

In The Punisher War Journal vol. 2 #4, the Punisher blew up a bar where Will o' the Wisp was attending a wake for Stilt-Man, after poisoning the guests. It was later mentioned in She-Hulk vol. 2 #17 that "they all had to get their stomachs pumped and be treated for third-degree burns."

Powers and abilities
As a result of exposure to Jackson Arvad and James Melvin's "magno-chamber", Will-O'-The-Wisp has the ability to control the electromagnetic particles that make up his body. This enables him to vary the density of his body to make part, or all, of his body intangible or rock hard similar to the synthezoid Vision. He also has superhuman strength at higher densities, and has superhuman speed and durability. Also, he has the ability of flight, and at subsonic speeds, Will-O'-The-Wisp appears to be nothing more than a glowing sphere. Will-O'-The-Wisp can also mesmerize people for a short period of time. Will-O'-The-Wisp can will the molecules of his body to oscillate at a small distance from his body, making him look like an ethereal glowing sphere.

Jackson Arvad is a brilliant scientist, especially in the field of electromagnetics, with a master's of science degree in electrical engineering.

References

External links
 Will o' the Wisp at Marvel.com
 Will o' the Wisp at Marvel Wiki
 Will o' the Wisp at Comic Vine
 Will o' the Wisp at MarvelDirectory.com

Characters created by Len Wein
Characters created by Ross Andru
Comics characters introduced in 1977
Fictional characters from Pennsylvania
Fictional characters with density control abilities
Fictional electrical engineers
Fictional physicists
Marvel Comics characters with superhuman strength
Marvel Comics mutates
Marvel Comics scientists
Marvel Comics superheroes
Marvel Comics supervillains
Spider-Man characters